Kudur is a place in the southern state of Karnataka, India. It is located in the Magadi taluk of Ramanagara district in Karnataka.

Demographics

 India Census, Kudur had a population of 9114 with 4568 males and 4546 females. The location is accessible from Solur (around 12 km to Kudur) or from Marur handpost (around 5 km to Kudur). Both these locations lie right on NH 75 (Bangalore-Mangalore Highway).

See also
 Ramanagara District
 Districts of Karnataka

References

External links
 http://Bangalorerural.nic.in/

Villages in Bangalore Rural district